Pablo Sánchez López (born February 9, 1990 in Mexico City) is a Mexican racing driver. He competed in the 2009 Italian Formula Three season in which he finished third and won four races. This earned him a drive, along with the two drivers who finished ahead of him in the standings, in a Formula One Ferrari at the December 2009 young driver test at Jerez. López has also competed in such series as International Formula Master in which he finished third in 2007, taking two race victories.

Racing record

Complete Formula Renault 3.5 Series results
(key) (Races in bold indicate pole position) (Races in italics indicate fastest lap)

Complete GP3 Series results
(key) (Races in bold indicate pole position) (Races in italics indicate fastest lap)

References

External links
 Career statistics from Driver Database

1990 births
Living people
Racing drivers from Mexico City
Mexican racing drivers
Italian Formula Renault 2.0 drivers
Formula Renault Eurocup drivers
Italian Formula Three Championship drivers
International Formula Master drivers
Mexican GP3 Series drivers
World Series Formula V8 3.5 drivers
BVM Racing drivers
Cram Competition drivers